Two destroyers of Japan have borne the name Mochizuki:

 , a  launched in 1927 and sunk in 1943
 , a  launched in 1968 and decommissioned in 1999

Japanese Navy ship names